Sámi parliament may refer to the following:
Kola Sámi Assembly, unofficial representative body of Sámi people in Russia
Sámi Parliament of Finland, official representative body of Sámi people in Finland
Sámi Parliament of Norway, official representative body of Sámi people in Norway
Sámi Parliament of Sweden, official representative body of Sámi people in Sweden